Líneas Aéreas Nacionales, or National Airlines (abbreviated LAN or LANSA), may refer to:

 LATAM Ecuador formerly Líneas Aéreas Nacionales del Ecuador
 LATAM Chile formerly  Lan Chile
 Líneas Aéreas Nacionales S.A., Peru
 LATAM Perú formerly  LAN Perú S.A.